Maroš Ferenc (born 19 February 1981, in Prešov) is a former Slovak football goalkeeper who currently acts as a goalkeeping coach in Senica.

References

1981 births
Living people
Sportspeople from Prešov
Slovak footballers
Slovakia youth international footballers
Association football goalkeepers
1. FC Tatran Prešov players
AS Trenčín players
MEAP Nisou players
Cypriot Second Division players
Cypriot Fourth Division players
FK Slavoj Trebišov players
MFK Zemplín Michalovce players
FC Lokomotíva Košice players
TJ Rozvoj Pušovce players
FC Eindhoven players
Eerste Divisie players
Slovak Super Liga players
2. Liga (Slovakia) players
3. Liga (Slovakia) players
4. Liga (Slovakia) players
Slovak expatriate footballers
Expatriate footballers in the Netherlands
Slovak expatriate sportspeople in the Netherlands
Expatriate footballers in Cyprus
Slovak expatriate sportspeople in Cyprus